An old maid is an older unmarried woman.

Old maid or Old Maid may also refer to:

Games
Old maid (card game), a simple game popular around the world, existing in many variants
, a German card game (variant of ) whose name translates as 'old maid'

Film
 The Old Maid (1939 film), an American drama film starring Bette Davis
 The Old Maid (1972 film), a French film by Jean-Pierre Blanc

Literature
  (novel) or The Old Maid, an 1836 novel by Honoré de Balzac
 The Old Maid, a 1924 novella by Edith Wharton that was the basis for the 1935 Broadway play and the 1939 feature film
 The Old Maid, a 1935 play by Zoe Akins
 The Old Maid, a 1761 play by Arthur Murphy

Other uses
 Catocala badia or old maid, an owlet moth species 
 Old maid, an unpopped kernel in a batch of popped popcorn kernels
 Old Maid (HBC vessel), operated by the HBC from 1928-1930, see Hudson's Bay Company vessels

See also
 The Old Maid and the Thief, a 1937 opera by Gian Carlo Menotti
 "Old Maid Boogie", a 1947 R&B song by Eddie Vinson
 Old maid's bonnets (Lupinus perennis), a flowering plant species in the family Fabaceae
 Old maid's insanity or erotomania
 Old maid's nightcap (Geranium maculatum), a flowering plant species in the family Geraniaceae
 Old-maid's-pink (Agrostemma), a flowering plant genus in the family Caryophyllaceae